YaYa Diaby (born May 30, 1999) is an American football defensive end. He played college football at Louisville.

Career
Diaby attended North Clayton High School in College Park, Georgia.

Diaby attended Georgia Military College for two years before transferring to the University of Louisville. He had 77 tackles and seven sacks at Georgia Military. 

In Diaby's first year at Louisville in 2020, he started seven of eight games, recording 18 tackles. In 2021, he had 39 tackles and 1.5 sacks. In 2022, Diaby had 37 tackles and nine sacks. After the season, he entered the 2023 NFL Draft.

References

External links
Louisville Cardinals bio

1999 births
Living people
Players of American football from Georgia (U.S. state)
American football defensive ends
Louisville Cardinals football players